John McMillan (May 14, 1851 – 1927) was a farmer and political figure on Prince Edward Island. He represented 2nd Queens from 1905 to 1911 and from 1916 to 1919 as a Liberal.

He was born in Fairview, Lot 65, Prince Edward Island, the son of Captain Ewan McMillan and Isabella Matheson, and was educated at Prince of Wales College. McMillan operated a large farm in Lot 65. For a short time, he worked as a sailour, travelling to Europe and the West Indies. In 1882, he married Margaret Hamilton Reid. McMillan also served as director of a cheese manufacturing company. From 1908 to 1912, he was a member of the province's Executive Council. McMillan was defeated when he ran for reelection to the provincial assembly in 1912.

References 
 

Prince Edward Island Liberal Party MLAs
1851 births
1927 deaths